Lieu-Saint-Amand is a commune in the Nord department in northern France. It is the home of the Sevel Nord facility, an automobile factory which builds Fiat, Peugeot and Citroën vehicles.

Heraldry

See also
Communes of the Nord department

References

External links
 Official website

Lieusaintamand